Tetratheca confertifolia is a species of flowering plant in the quandong family that is endemic to Australia.

Description
The species grows as an erect (rarely decumbent) shrub to 10–30 cm in height. The pink or white flowers appear from August to December.

Distribution and habitat
The range of the species lies within the Avon Wheatbelt, Geraldton Sandplains, Jarrah Forest, Mallee and Swan Coastal Plain IBRA bioregions of south-west Western Australia. The plants grow on sandy and lateritic soils.

References

confertifolia
Eudicots of Western Australia
Oxalidales of Australia
Taxa named by Joachim Steetz
Plants described in 1845